San Nicolás is a municipality in the Honduran department of Santa Bárbara.

About six thousand people live in San Nicolás. The economy consists primarily of coffee farmers and workers from the surrounding area. Full advantage has not been taken of nearby rivers, caves, and remarkable countryside as tourist draws, though they well could be.

Demographics
At the time of the 2013 Honduras census, San Nicolás municipality had a population of 14,368. Of these, 81.42% were Mestizo, 17.80% White, 0.57% Indigenous, 0.19% Black or Afro-Honduran and 0.01% others.

References

Municipalities of the Santa Bárbara Department, Honduras